Shankar  is a 2009 Indian Telugu-language action comedy film produced by J Bhagavan, J Pulla Rao under Sri Balaji Cine Media banner and directed by Siva and associated by Shiva Rama Krishna. Starring Gopichand, Trisha and Sathyaraj, the music was composed by S. Thaman.

The film follows a Chandu, an NRI living in Australia with his uncle and friend. When Chandu's girlfriend Mahalakshmi is forcefully taken to India by her violent family members, he arrives in India to marry her but is assigned a task that would eventually pull him into an ages-old feud with the rival village and lead him to the discovery of his true identity.

The film was released theatrically on 11 September 2009. The film was also dubbed and released in Hindi as Phir Ek Most Wanted in 2010, in Bhojpuri as Baghi Balma and in Tamil as Sivappu Saamy. It was remade in Dhallywood as Kothin Prothishodh starring Shakib Khan & Apu Biswas.

Plot
Chandu (Gopichand) is a rich, rough youth brought up by his uncle Krishna Rao (Chandra Mohan) in Australia. Mahalakshmi (Trisha) stays in Australia along with her uncle Pichaiah (Dharmavarapu Subrahmanyam), who runs a restaurant. Chandu is fond of martial arts, but he never gets a chance to exhibit them in real situations. Mahalakshmi is another martial arts freak. After a few misunderstandings, they fall in love. One day, Mahalakshmi is forced to come back to her hometown in Rayalaseema. Chandu comes in search of her. Meanwhile, Sivaiah (Sathyaraj) and his archenemy, Mahalakshmi's father Pashupati (Kota Srinivasa Rao) are the rich leaders of  two neighboring villages, in Rayalaseema. They have longtime enmity. Chandu comes to Mahalakshmi's village and asks her hand in marriage. Though Pashupati's sister opposes this, Pashupati agrees based on one condition, that Chandu must escort his brother from railway station to home safely. The brother Rajappa (Supreeth), has been on a 23-year self-imposed exile from the district, due to his life being under threat of Sivaiah and his entire village. Chandu agrees and does so, beating 30 men of Siviah on the way. Then Chandu is challenged to go to Siviah alone to his house. While walking in Sivaiah's house, he is beaten up badly by Sivaiah's men that he laid at the door of the house. When Sivaiah saw his face, he recognized Chandu and rushed him to the hospital where he is saved. The incident reached to Chandu's uncle who flew to India. Uncle Krishna Rao is shocked to see Chandu with Siviah and proceeds to tell Chandu about his parents. Siviah is actually Chandu's father. 23 years ago, there was a big feud between village for sharing water, in which multitude of lives were lost in clashes. Siviah's wife pleads him to stop the fight, to which he pays no heed. She gives birth to twins, but one child and her parents are killed in a car-bomb, before her very eyes. This makes her to take Chandu and go to her native. After 2 years, she has a change of heart and comes to meet Siviah. As they are about to reconcile, Rajappa ambushes Siviah, and kills his wife before his eyes, despite his pleas. He sent Chandu with the uncle and has paid for all of his expenses since then. Chandu then joins Siviah as his heir, and the rest of the story is how he defeats both Pasupati and his brothers.

Cast

Gopichand as Chandu
Trisha as Mahalakshmi
Sathyaraj as Sivaiah  (Chandu's father)
Chandra Mohan as Krishna Rao a.k.a. Kittu (Chandu's uncle)
Kota Srinivasa Rao as Pashupati (Mahalakshmi's father)
Ali as Saif Ali Khan
Dharmavarapu Subramanyam as Pichaiah (Mahalakshmi's uncle)
Tanikella Bharani as Narrator
L. B. Sriram as Villager
Venu Madhav as Prem Kumar
Krishna Bhagavaan as Lawyer
Raghu Babu as Doctor
Supreeth as Simha Gajapati Naidu (Pashupati's brother)
Banerjee as Suri
Prudhvi Raj as Pasupati's brother-in-law
Srinivasa Reddy as Seenu
Raghunatha Reddy as M.P.
Subbaraya Sharma as Doctor
Chitti as Collector
Melkoti as Feroz Khan
Fish Venkat as Pasupati's henchmen
Telangana Shakuntala as Pashupati's sister
Seetha as Parvathi (Sivaiah's wife and Chandu's mother)
Rajitha as Pichaiah's wife
Apoorva
Devisri
Swathi as Katrina
Ramya Chowdary
Aruna
Priya
Usha Rani
Anil Ravipudi (cameo)

Soundtrack

Music composed by S. Thaman. Music released on Aditya Music Company.

Reception
Sankham received mixed to positive reviews from critics. Idlebrain rated it 2.5/5, calling it a clichéd film. 123telugu rated it 3.25/5, along with stating that "Shankam can be watched once as it does meet the minimum audience expectation of watching a timepass movie."

References

External links

2009 films
2009 action comedy films
2000s Telugu-language films
Indian action comedy films
Films directed by Siva (director)
Films set in Sydney
2000s masala films
Films scored by Thaman S
Films shot in Sydney
Telugu films remade in other languages
2009 comedy films